Qoli Kandi may refer to:
 Qoli Kandi, Charuymaq, East Azerbaijan Province
 Qoli Kandi, Malekan, East Azerbaijan Province
 Qoli Kandi, Hamadan
 Qoli Kandi, Zanjan